Gnezdilovo is a rural locality (a selo) in Seletskoye Rural Settlement, Suzdalsky District, Vladimir Oblast, in European Russia. The population was 31 as of 2010.

Geography 
Gnezdilovo is located 11 km southwest of Suzdal (the district's administrative centre) by road. Chernizh is the nearest rural locality.

References 

Rural localities in Suzdalsky District
Suzdalsky Uyezd